James Redford (September 18, 1821 – December 18, 1908) was an Ontario businessman and political figure. He represented Perth North in the House of Commons of Canada as a Liberal member from 1867 to 1872.

Redford was born in Lilliesleaf, Roxburghshire, Scotland in 1821, to a father who was also named James Redford. The younger Redford was educated there and went to Canada West in 1842. He was a schoolteacher for a time, and was later a banker, lumber merchant, manufacturer and land speculator in Stratford and Mitchell. In 1851, Redford married Elizabeth Gouray. He served as superintendent of schools in Perth County and a member of the Stratford town council. He was a director of the Royal Canadian Bank and also served as captain in the local militia. Redford moved to Austin, Texas around 1876 and died there at the age of 87.

References

External links
 A Guide to the Redford Family Diaries, University of Texas at San Antonio Libraries (UTSA Libraries) Special Collections.
 

1821 births
1909 deaths
Liberal Party of Canada MPs
Members of the House of Commons of Canada from Ontario
People from the Scottish Borders
Scottish emigrants to pre-Confederation Ontario
People from Stratford, Ontario
Immigrants to the Province of Canada